is a sports video game developed and published by Sega for arcades in 1997. It is the sequel to the 1994 video game Virtua Striker, and the second game in the Virtua Striker series. A series of updates was released from 1998 to 1999, starting with Virtua Striker 2 ver. 1998 and ending with Virtua Striker 2 ver. 2000.1 , that latest update being released for the Dreamcast in Japan in 1999, and then internationally in 2000, with the North American version re-titled to Virtua Striker 2.

The arcade game was a major success in Japan, where it was the second highest-grossing arcade game of 1998 and the overall highest-grossing arcade game of 1999. The Dreamcast version, however, received mixed reviews from critics.



Amusement Arcades UK list 
Virtua Striker 2 
Butlins Minehead (1999–2003) 
Megabowl (2001)

Virtua Striker 2 ver. 1998 
Tenby (2001–2006) (In Arcade Games Room Amusement In Heatherton Activity Park and New Minerton Leisure Park)

Virtua Striker 2 Version '99
Porthcawl (1999–2007)

Reception

Arcade
The arcade game was a major hit in Japan, where it became the second highest-grossing arcade game of 1998, below Tekken 3. Virtua Striker 2 was later the overall highest-grossing arcade game of 1999 in Japan.

Dreamcast
The Dreamcast version received mixed reviews according to the review aggregation website GameRankings. In Japan, Famitsu gave it a score of 33 out of 40. In the United Kingdom, Computer and Video Games scored it 5 out of 5 stars. They said the arcade gameplay "will initially dismay" International Superstar Soccer (ISS) fans, but that it is not a "simulation, it's a full-on arcade game." They called it "the finest arcade football game ever" and said, though some might criticise the lack of depth, "the massive andrenaline rush you get" from playing "more than compensates." They compared it to Crazy Taxi, in that both provide "instant" fun gaming. In North America, Rob Smolka of Next Generation said that the game "may look good, but the poor controls drag this one down to rental status".

References

External links
 

1997 video games
Arcade video games
Association football video games
Dreamcast games
Sega arcade games
Video game sequels
Video games developed in Japan